Kathleen Ngale (alternative spellings include Kngale, Kngala, Kngal, Ngala etc.) is a senior Australian Aboriginal artist, born  in the Utopia region of Central Australia. Kathleen Ngale belongs to the oldest living generation of Utopia artists and has been compared to Emily Kngwarreye, Minnie Pwerle, and Kathleen Petyarre.

Life
Kathleen Ngale was born around 1930 at the Camel Camp Station, 250 km north-East of Alice Springs, where she still lives with her extended family. She started working in Batik in 1979 and pursued her work in that medium until she, along with many other Aboriginal artists, was introduced in the late 1980s to painting in acrylic colours on canvas. Her work since then has come to be seen as some of the most sophisticated and complex in the Aboriginal art scene. She has been featured in many exhibitions, both in Australia and overseas, and she was a finalist in the National Aboriginal and Torres Strait Islander Award in both 2000 and 2008. Kathleen Ngale is now the senior custodian of the cultural knowledge of her country, Arlparra.  Her younger sisters Polly Ngale and Angelina Pwerle Ngale are also artists.

Work
Kathleen Ngale's works are a depiction of her country, Arlparre, and its 'Bush Plum' (anwekety) Dreaming. Her paintings are made up of numerous layers of superimposed dots, creating a feeling of depth, light and movement. There is virtually as much hidden in these works as there is visible in a surface reading, with many underdotting colour planes shimmering through the top layers in a highly complex interplay. Her subtly dotted underpainting often consists of yellows, reds, purples, greens, over which she then often applies a thick layer of overdotting which almost obscures the underdotting altogether or fuses with it to create a surface of delicate, fragile colour softer than the original underdotting, red and white often fusing into a translucent, fleshy white/pink. The colour is often thickly applied or washed out, but then in the surface of the same canvas the overdotting can in some parts become very sparse, allowing the viewer to see down through the painting's surface into a field of deep or 'negative' space. Sasha Grishin, Sir William Dobell Professor of Art History at the Australian National University, wrote in 2009: "Although Kathleen Kngale has been painting for over two decades, it is only in recent years that she has been acclaimed as one of the most significant and exciting artists in contemporary Utopia painting, creating memorable and visually dazzling paintings... She is an artist who has created an unique and distinctive stylistic language, one of great visual power and spiritual resonance."

Her works (as well as those of her sister Polly, born c. 1940) have become sought after in recent years.

Selected exhibitions
1992 Modern Art-Ancient Icon – The World Bank, Washington, US
2000 Urapunja artists in Brisbane, Micheal Sourgnes
2000 Out of the Desert, Desert Gallery – Sydney
2001 Utopia a Special Painting Place – Bett Gallery, Hobart, Tasmania
2002 Two sisters, Kathleen and Polly, Lorraine Diggins, Melbourne
2002 Australian Modern, Fondazione Mudima, Milan, Italy
2004-2006 ArtParis International Contemporary Art Fair, Grand Palais, Paris
2005 October Gallery, London
2006 Galerie Clément, Vevey, Switzerland
2006 Lorraine Diggins exhibition, London
2006 Senior Women of Utopia, GalleryG, Brisbane
2007 Patterns of Power, art from the Eastern Desert, Simmer on the Bay Gallery, Sydney
2008 Emily Kngwarreye and Her Legacy, Tokyo, Japan
2008 Galerie Brenart, 221 Avenue Louise, Bruxelles (Brussels), Belgium
2014 Visions of Utopia, Mitchell Fine Art, Brisbane
2017 Desert Dots II, Utopia Lane Gallery, Melbourne
2018 Beyond the Veil, Olsen Gruin Gallery, New York

Selected collections

National Gallery of Australia
National Gallery of Victoria, Melbourne
Thomas Vroom Collection, Utrecht, the Netherlands
Holmas a Court Collection, Perth

Notes

References
http://www.aboriginal-art.com/desert_pages/utopia_thumb_12.html
http://collection-ben.blogspot.com/2008/02/visite-bruxelles-de-lexpo-les-grands.html
http://www.metrogallery.com.au/artists/artist/35/Kathleen%20Kngale/
Kreczmanski, Janusz B & Birnberg, Margo (eds.): Aboriginal Artists: Dictionary of Biographies: Central Desert, Western Desert & Kimberley Region (JB Publishing Australia, Marleston, 2004)

1930s births
Living people
Australian Aboriginal artists
Australian women painters
20th-century Australian painters
20th-century Australian women artists
21st-century Australian painters
21st-century Australian women artists
Artists from the Northern Territory